The accompanying artery of ischiadic nerve is a long, slender artery in the thigh. It branches of the inferior gluteal artery. It accompanies the sciatic nerve for a short distance. It then penetrates it, and runs in its substance to the lower part of the thigh.

References

Arteries of the abdomen